This article lists the official squads for the 1998 Women's Rugby World Cup in the Netherlands.

Pool A

England

Canada

Netherlands

Sweden

Pool B

United States

Spain

Wales

Russia

Pool C

New Zealand
Coach: Darryl Suasua

Scotland

Italy

Germany

Pool D

Australia

France

Ireland

Kazakhstan

Notes and references

Squads
1998